Gabriel Eduardo Saporta (born October 11, 1979) is an Uruguayan-American musician and entrepreneur. From the years 2005 until 2015, he was the lead vocalist and founder of the electropop band Cobra Starship. On November 10, 2015, after nearly ten years and two Billboard Hot 100 top 10 hits, Saporta announced that the band would stop its work, and that he would be focusing on helping other musicians through his new venture, The Artist Group. Prior to Cobra Starship, Saporta had been the lead singer, bassist, and lyricist for the punk band Midtown.

Early life
Gabe Saporta was born in Montevideo, Uruguay. His family is Jewish; his grandparents and great-grandparents escaped Europe during World War II and settled in Uruguay. When he was four years old, he moved with his parents to New York City. At an early age, Saporta developed a passion for music, which became his escape and salvation from a tumultuous upbringing. Saporta fell in love with music because of its ability to deliver messages and connect people. His first love was hip hop, but soon after he discovered punk rock and started going to shows to see bands such as Gorilla Biscuits, Fugazi, and Pavement, it was not long before Saporta, along with his brother Ricky, started to put on his own shows and put out his own records.

Career

Career beginnings and Midtown (1998–2005) 
When he was 16 years old, Saporta "joined his first band-- the appropriately titled Humble Beginnings" as a bass player. While in college at Rutgers University, he started the pop punk band Midtown. As the vocalist, lyricist, and bassist in Midtown, Saporta attracted widespread attention. The group released one EP and three LP albums: The Sacrifice of Life, Save the World, Lose the Girl, Living Well Is the Best Revenge and Forget What You Know, respectively.

Midtown encountered legal troubles with its first label after releasing its second album. It was during this time that Saporta who "was quite the businessman" decided he wanted to understand the music business from the other side and started managing a band named Armor For Sleep. As Armor For Sleep became successful, Saporta made a deal to merge his fledgling company into Crush Management, who would also manage Midtown. Crush later went on to launch Cobra Starship with Saporta.

After disbanding, Midtown developed a cult-like following. In response to this renewed interest, Midtown reunited for a secret show in Brooklyn and to headline the Skate & Surf Festival in Asbury Park, NJ in 2014. In 2022, Midtown announced several dates in support of My Chemical Romance in the fall of that year, alongside two headlining shows at the Starland Ballroom.

Cobra Starship (2006–2015) 
After Midtown, Gabe Saporta wanted to start a project that was more light-hearted and whose music could incorporate diverse electronic influences. The idea for Cobra Starship came to him during a trip in the Arizona desert in 2005. Saporta produced and recorded the first Cobra album by himself with S*A*M & Sluggo. An early helpful development for Cobra Starship was when Midtown's management company set Saporta up with an opportunity to record a song for the soundtrack to the 2006 action film Snakes on a Plane, which became a minor hit.

By 2007, Cobra Starship was a full band and started touring the country. Cobra's eclectic sound allowed them to tour with acts as diverse as 30 Seconds to Mars, Fall Out Boy, and Travie McCoy. They also performed with many electronic acts such as Girl Talk and Kaskade.

From 2006 to 2014, Cobra Starship released four full-length albums, and scored two double-platinum Top 10 hits ("Good Girls Go Bad" and "You Make Me Feel"), as well as one gold record for "Hot Mess". Their single "Good Girls Go Bad" features guest vocals by Leighton Meester. Coincidentally, Saporta made his acting debut a few years later in the season 5 finale of Gossip Girl.

In 2012, Cobra Starship was the main support for Justin Bieber on his entire South American stadium tour.

T∆G // The Artist Group (2015–present) 
On his Beats1 Radio show in November 2015, Gabe Saporta announced that he would no longer be performing or putting out new music. Saporta and business associate Mike Carden have announced the formation of a talent management firm, T∆G // The Artist Group, which is expected to commence operations in the first quarter of 2016. Saporta has explained that now he wants to work behind the scenes and help younger artists see their dreams come true.

In 2022, Gabe Saporta joined beatBread's Artist Advocacy Council, which provides "critical advice" to the independent music funding platform. Saporta joins Mike Caren (Artist Partner Group), Dave Dederer (founding member of The Presidents of the United States of America), Diana Rodriguez (Criteria Entertainment), Kei Henderson (Third & Hayden), Ray Daniels (Raydar, LLC), and Nick Jarjour (Hipgnosis).

Other work 
On June 5, 2010, MTV aired an episode of When I Was 17, which focused on Gabe Saporta and discussed his life as a teenager. Saporta has hosted and been a correspondent for various music-related TV shows including being a presenter at the VMAs, a US correspondent for The EMAs and BBC1, and hosting several countdown shows on Fuse.

In March 2013, Gabe Saporta was featured on "Make It Out This Town", the first single by American rapper Eve's fourth album Lip Lock. In 2015, Saporta started working with Beats1 Radio as on-air talent and show host.

Beyond music, Saporta's other ventures include restaurants, real estate, and fashion.

Personal life
Saporta's father, Diego Saporta, studied medicine and became a physician in Montevideo. Disenchanted with the then-ineffective and somewhat corrupt health care system in Uruguay, among other reasons, the elder Saporta elected to leave the country with his family in the early 1980s.  As a result, he undertook his medical training for a second time in the United States. Gabe Saporta has described his father's perseverance as an inspiration.

Saporta attended Rutgers University, where he majored in philosophy and political science.

In May 2013, Saporta and Erin Fetherston got married. In March 2016, the couple welcomed their first child, a son.

Guest vocals
Gabe Saporta was featured on the songs:

References

External links

The Artist Group website
Gabe Saporta official website

1979 births
Living people
21st-century American guitarists
21st-century American Jews
21st-century American singers
Alternative dance musicians
Alternative rock bass guitarists
Alternative rock guitarists
Alternative rock singers
American alternative rock musicians
American dance musicians
American electronic musicians
American male bass guitarists
American male guitarists
American male pop singers
American male singers
American people of Austrian-Jewish descent
American people of Spanish-Jewish descent
American people of Uruguayan-Jewish descent
American pop rock singers
American punk rock singers
American synth-pop musicians
Cobra Starship members
Columbia Records artists
Dance-pop musicians
Decaydance Records artists
Drive-Thru Records artists
Fueled by Ramen artists
Guitarists from New Jersey
Guitarists from New York City
Hispanic and Latino American musicians
Jewish American musicians
Jewish rock musicians
Jewish singers
Jews in punk rock
MCA Records artists
People from Springfield Township, Union County, New Jersey
Rutgers University alumni
Singers from New Jersey
Singers from New York City
Singers from Montevideo
Synth-pop singers
Uruguayan emigrants to the United States
Uruguayan Jews
Uruguayan male guitarists
Uruguayan pop singers